St Paul's Methodist Church is a former Methodist church in the Manchester suburb of Didsbury. The building was designed by the architect H.H. Vale as a church for the nearby Wesleyan Theological Institution and opened in 1877. The building was converted into an office space in 1990. It is recorded in the National Heritage List for England as a designated Grade II listed building.

History
St Paul's Church was built as a memorial to the local philanthropist and MP, James Heald of Parrs Wood. It was designed by the Liverpudlian architect H.H. Vale, who at the time was also collaborating with Cornelius Sherlock on the design of the Walker Art Gallery in Liverpool. During the project, Vale committed suicide, and the church was completed by T D Barry & Sons. Construction lasted from 1875 to 1877.

Architecture

Built in the Victorian Gothic style, Vale's church displays freely interpreted elements of Early English and Geometrical Decorated Gothic architecture. The layout is cruciform with a belfry and steeple on the south-west corner. The stonework is sandstone and architectural elements typical of the style are used throughout, such as lancet windows and foliar decoration, with dormer windows along the nave.

The interior is noted for its arcades of polished Aberdeen granite and Irish marble columns with carved capitals, encaustic tiled floors, a  painted panelled barrel roof, richly carved stonework which features fruit and foliage inhabited with animals and birds, a stone pulpit resting on granite shafts, a baptismal font of Caen stone and a marble reredos. The interior walls are of Hollington stone. The church also includes several wall monuments to "tutors of this college".

The office conversion, which was carried out by the firm Downs & Variava in 1990, has been criticised favourably; the insertion of mezzanine floors is regarded as sympathetic to the spacious interior by the retention of the area under the crossing to roof height.

Modern use
The building is occupied today by a pipeline simulation & leak detection company, Atmos International.

Present-day church
Although the Victorian church building has now been put to secular use, Christian worship continues on the site at the neighbouring Didsbury Methodist Church, a small brick building dating from 1961.

See also
Grade II listed buildings in Manchester

References

Bibliography

External links

 Illustration of the Wesleyan College Chapel, Didsbury, Lancashire (The British Architect: A Journal of Architecture and the Accessory Arts, Volume 2, 1874)
 Didsbury Methodist Church - website of the present-day church
  - photographs of the converted office interior

Former churches in Greater Manchester
Former Methodist churches in the United Kingdom
Grade II listed churches in Manchester
Gothic Revival church buildings in Greater Manchester
Gothic Revival architecture in Greater Manchester
19th-century churches in the United Kingdom
Didsbury
1877 establishments in England
Methodist churches in Greater Manchester
Grade II listed office buildings
Office buildings in Manchester